KKFS (103.9 MHz The Fish) is a commercial FM radio station licensed to Lincoln, California, and serving the Sacramento metropolitan area.  The station carries a Christian contemporary radio format and is owned by the Salem Media Group, which also owns KFIA, KTKZ and KSAC-FM.  Salem uses "The Fish" as its branding for Christian contemporary stations in Los Angeles, Atlanta, Nashville and Cleveland.

KKFS has an effective radiated power (ERP) of 6,000 watts.  The transmitter is on Cherry Hill Road near Interstate 80 in Newcastle.

History
On November 8, 1974, the station first signed on the air.  Its original city of license was Yuba City and it held the call sign KHEX.

In 2003, the station was sold to First Broadcasting which relaunched the station with an all 1980's music format and using the moniker "Flash 103.9". In 2005, the station was sold to Bustos Media which then spun the station off to Salem Communications.  Salem moved the company's "Fish" Christian contemporary music format over from 105.5 to 103.9.  105.5 then flipped to a business news and information format as KSAC-FM.

References

External links
103.9 The Fish official website

KFS
KFS
Radio stations established in 1974
Salem Media Group properties
1974 establishments in California